Ričardas Berankis is the defending champion, but lost in the first round to Adrian Mannarino.
Daniel Brands won the title, defeating Matthias Bachinger 7–6(7–2), 7–6(7–5) in the final.

Seeds

Draw

Finals

Top half

Bottom half

References
 Main Draw
 Qualifying Draw

IPP Open - Singles
IPP Open